Holcostethus albipes is a shield bug belonging to the family Pentatomidae, subfamily Pentatominae. The species was first described by Johan Christian Fabricius in 1781.

The head is trapezoidal and the lateral margin of pronotal callus is sinuous.

It is mainly found in Austria, Slovenia, France, Greece, Italy and Spain.

References

 Rider D.A., 2004 - Family Pentatomidae - Catalogue of the Heteroptera of the Palaearctic Region

External links
 Fauna Europaea
 EOL
 BioLib

Insects described in 1781
Hemiptera of Europe
Pentatomini